The McKee Orchestra and Trio was an instrumental recording group in American popular music during the 1910s.

For several years the McKee Trio was contracted by the Victor Talking Machine Company (later known as RCA Victor).

The still-available recordings include an especially plaintive 1915 rendition of "A Perfect Day" by Carrie Jacobs-Bond (see inset).

Notes

American music history
American musical groups
Vaudeville performers